Stafford Township is one of fifteen townships in DeKalb County, Indiana. As of the 2010 census, its population was 283 and it contained 123 housing units.

Geography

Unincorporated towns
 Stafford Center

Major highways
  U.S. Route 6

Cemeteries
The township contains one cemetery, Wartenbe.

Popular Culture
The fictional Dr. Richard Kimble from the 1960s television series The Fugitive was from a community called Stafford in Indiana, as was his pursuer Lt. Gerard. The Kimble family lived in Stafford throughout the series.

References
 United States Census Bureau cartographic boundary files
 U.S. Board on Geographic Names

External links
 Indiana Township Association
 United Township Association of Indiana

Townships in DeKalb County, Indiana
Townships in Indiana